Viatcheslav Sinkevich (born November 29, 1991 in Krasnoobsk) is a Russian swimmer. At the 2012 Summer Olympics, he competed in the Men's 200 metre breaststroke, finishing in 9th place overall in the heats, qualifying for the semi final, but failing to reach the final.  He was also part of Russia's 4 x 100 m medley relay team at that Olympics; that team also failed to reach the final.

Later in 2012, Sinkevich won two medals at the World Short Course Championships, a silver in the men's 4 x 100 m medley relay (with Stanislav Donets, Nikolay Skvortsov and Vladimir Morozov) and a bronze medal in the men's 200 m breaststroke.

He has also won multiple medals at the European Short Course Championships, with gold in the 200 m breaststroke in 2012 and the men's 4 x 50 m medley relay in 2013, after a silver in the men's 200 m breaststroke in 2011.

References

External links
 
 
 

1991 births
Living people
Russian male swimmers
Male breaststroke swimmers
Olympic swimmers of Russia
Swimmers at the 2012 Summer Olympics
Medalists at the FINA World Swimming Championships (25 m)
Universiade medalists in swimming
Universiade gold medalists for Russia
Sportspeople from Novosibirsk Oblast